William McChord Hurt (March 20, 1950 – March 13, 2022) was an American actor. Known for his performances on stage and screen, he received various awards including an Academy Award, BAFTA Award and Cannes Film Festival Award for Best Actor.

He studied at the Juilliard School and began acting on stage in the 1970s. Hurt's film debut was in Ken Russell's science-fiction feature Altered States, released in 1980, for which he received a Golden Globe nomination for New Star of the Year. In 1981, he had a leading role in the neo-noir Body Heat, co-starring Kathleen Turner. His starring roles in a series of critically acclaimed films garnered three consecutive nominations for the Academy Award for Best Actor: Kiss of the Spider Woman (1985), which he won; Children of a Lesser God (1986), and Broadcast News (1987). During this time he also starred in The Big Chill (1983), The Accidental Tourist (1988), Alice (1990), and One True Thing (1998).

Hurt earned his fourth Academy Award nomination for Best Supporting Actor in David Cronenberg's crime thriller A History of Violence (2005). His later character roles include A.I. Artificial Intelligence (2001), The Village (2004), Syriana (2005), The Good Shepherd (2006), Mr. Brooks (2007), Into the Wild (2007), The Yellow Handkerchief (2008), and Robin Hood (2010). In 2008, he portrayed Thaddeus Ross in The Incredible Hulk, a role he reprised in other Marvel Cinematic Universe films until his final appearance in Black Widow (2021).

Hurt's various television projects included the FX legal drama Damages, which earned him a nomination for the Primetime Emmy Award for Outstanding Supporting Actor in a Drama Series. In 2011, he portrayed Henry Paulson in the HBO movie Too Big to Fail and received another Primetime Emmy nomination for Outstanding Lead Actor in a Limited Series or Movie. 

On stage, Hurt appeared in off-Broadway productions including Henry V, Fifth of July, Richard II and A Midsummer Night's Dream; and made his Broadway debut in David Rabe's dark comedy Hurlyburly, for which he received a nomination for the Tony Award for Best Actor in a Play.

Early life and education 
Hurt was born on March 20, 1950, in Washington, D.C., to Claire Isabel (née McGill; 1923–1971), who worked for Time Inc., and Alfred McChord Hurt (1910–1996), who worked for the United States Agency for International Development and the State Department. He had two brothers. With his father, he lived in Lahore, Mogadishu, and Khartoum. His parents divorced and, in 1960, his mother married Henry Luce III (1925–2005), a son of publisher Henry Luce.

Hurt attended the Middlesex School, where he was vice-president of the Dramatics Club and had the lead role in several school plays. He graduated in 1968 and his yearbook predicted, "you might even see him on Broadway." Hurt attended Tufts University and studied theology, but turned instead to acting and joined the Juilliard School (Drama Division Group 5: 1972–1976).

Career 
Hurt began his career in stage productions. From 1977 to 1989, he was a member of the acting company at Circle Repertory Company. He won an Obie Award for his debut appearance there in Corinne Jacker's My Life, and won a 1978 Theatre World Award for his performances in Fifth of July, Ulysses in Traction, and Lulu. In 1979, Hurt played Hamlet under the direction of Marshall W. Mason opposite Lindsay Crouse and Beatrice Straight. 

His first major film role was in the science-fiction film Altered States (1980), where his performance as an obsessed scientist gained him wide recognition. His performance opposite newcomer Kathleen Turner in Lawrence Kasdan's neo-noir film Body Heat (1981) elevated Hurt to stardom. Kasdan and he became frequent collaborators: Hurt co-starred in Kasdan's acclaimed comedy-dramas The Big Chill (1983) and The Accidental Tourist (1988), both of which were nominated for the Academy Award for Best Picture, and he later had a supporting role in the ensemble comedy I Love You to Death (1990). 

Hurt appeared in the thriller Gorky Park (1983) opposite Lee Marvin. He received the Best Male Performance Prize at the Cannes Film Festival and the Academy Award for Best Actor for his turn as a prisoner in Hector Babenco's drama Kiss of the Spider Woman in 1985. He received three additional Oscar nominations: Best Actor for Children of a Lesser God (1986) and Broadcast News (1987; he was thus nominated for Best Actor for three consecutive years) and Best Supporting Actor for A History of Violence (2005). Broadcast News, a romantic comedy directed by James L. Brooks, is possibly Hurt's most acclaimed film and is included at the National Film Registry by the Library of Congress.

After this run of particularly prominent roles in the 1980s, Hurt began to appear more frequently in supporting roles. Some of his notable roles include performances in Dark City (1998), Lost in Space (1998), Sunshine (1999), A.I. Artificial Intelligence (2001), Tuck Everlasting (2002), The Village (2004), A History of Violence (2005), and Syriana (2005). Hurt received particular acclaim for his role in A History of Violence, where despite less than 10 minutes of screen time, he received an Academy Award nomination.

In June 2007, Marvel Studios announced that Hurt would portray General Thaddeus Ross in the 2008 film The Incredible Hulk alongside Edward Norton, Liv Tyler, and Tim Roth. Hurt reprised his role in four additional Marvel Cinematic Universe (MCU) films: Captain America: Civil War (2016), Avengers: Infinity War (2018), Avengers: Endgame (2019), and Black Widow (2021).

Other later film roles included Into the Wild (2007), Mr. Brooks (2007), Vantage Point (2008), The Yellow Handkerchief (2008), and Robin Hood (2010).

Hurt had several roles in television and theater. Hurt starred in the Sci Fi Channel miniseries adaptation Frank Herbert's Dune in 2000, playing Duke Leto Atreides; it was one of Syfy's highest-rated series ever. He was in the miniseries adaptation of Stephen King's Nightmares and Dreamscapes, in a piece titled Battleground (known for its complete lack of dialogue). He appeared in the cast of Vanya, an adaptation of Anton Chekhov's Uncle Vanya, at the Artists Repertory Theatre in Portland, Oregon. In 2009, Hurt became a series regular on the FX series Damages playing a corporate whistleblower opposite Glenn Close and Marcia Gay Harden. For his role in the series, he earned a 2009 Primetime Emmy Award nomination in the "Outstanding Supporting Actor in a Drama Series" category. In September 2010, Hurt played United States Secretary of the Treasury Henry Paulson in the HBO film Too Big to Fail, an adaptation of Andrew Ross Sorkin's book. He also starred as Captain Ahab in the 2011 television adaptation of Herman Melville's novel Moby-Dick. 

In 2018, Hurt was cast as the lead in The Coldest Game (2019), but after he was injured in an off-set accident, he was replaced by Bill Pullman. In one of his final roles, Hurt played opposite F. Murray Abraham in a standalone episode of Mythic Quest in 2021. Hurt had been set to appear in the series Pantheon and films The Fence, Men of Granite, and Edward Enderby before his death in March 2022, though he ultimately only appeared in Pantheon.

Personal life 
Hurt was married to Mary Beth Hurt (née Supinger) from 1971 to 1982, and to Heidi Henderson from 1989 to 1993. Hurt had four children: one with Sandra Jennings; two with Henderson; and one with French actress, film director, and screenwriter Sandrine Bonnaire.

In 1981, while he was still married, Hurt and Jennings began a relationship in Saratoga Springs, New York. Jennings became pregnant in the spring of 1982, which led to Hurt's divorce from Mary Beth, after which Hurt and Jennings relocated to South Carolina, a state that recognized non-ceremonial common-law marriages.

Hurt and Jennings never held a marriage ceremony and later separated. Jennings sued him in New York, seeking recognition of their relationship as a common-law marriage under South Carolina law. The New York court held that the relationship between Hurt and Jennings did not qualify as a common-law marriage under South Carolina law and found in Hurt's favor that no marriage existed.  During Jennings' lawsuit against Hurt, she alleged that Hurt subjected her to physical and verbal abuse and "smashed her across the face" five days after the birth of their son. His spokesperson denied that Hurt ever beat Jennings.

Hurt was a private pilot and owner of a Beechcraft Bonanza. He was fluent in French and maintained a home outside Paris.

He dated Marlee Matlin for one year, and they cohabited for two years. In her 2009 autobiography I'll Scream Later, Matlin said that their relationship involved considerable drug abuse and physical violence from Hurt, including a rape. In response to the accusations aired on CNN on April 13, 2009, Hurt's agent declined to respond, but Hurt issued a statement the following day that his "own recollection is that we both apologized and both did a great deal to heal our lives. Of course, I did and do apologize for any pain I caused. And I know we have both grown. I wish Marlee and her family nothing but good."

In a 2022 essay for Variety, author Donna Kaz wrote about dating Hurt in their twenties, from 1977 to 1980. She accused Hurt of domestic violence, published in a 2016 memoir.

Death
In May 2018, it was announced that Hurt had terminal prostate cancer that had metastasized to his bones. He died from complications of the disease at  home in Portland, Oregon, on March 13, 2022, aged 71. Many paid tribute to Hurt including Ben Stiller, Russell Crowe, John Goodman, Patton Oswalt, Albert Brooks, Bryce Dallas Howard, Jonathan Frakes, Mark Ruffalo, and Topher Grace.

Filmography

Film

Television

Video games

Audiobooks

Theater

Awards and nominations

References

External links 

 
 
 
 Comprehensive career-overview interview with William Hurt
 

1950 births
2022 deaths
20th-century American male actors
21st-century American male actors
American male film actors
American male stage actors
Best Actor Academy Award winners
Best Actor BAFTA Award winners
Cannes Film Festival Award for Best Actor winners
David di Donatello winners
Deaths from cancer in Oregon
Deaths from prostate cancer
Juilliard School alumni
Male actors from Washington, D.C.
Middlesex School alumni
Tufts University School of Arts and Sciences alumni
Domestic violence in the United States